Raj Mistry or Raj Mistri is a term used in the Indian sub-continent to refer to master craftsmen, expert masons, foremen, and construction supervisors, or a person who has mastered his skill in field of construction and also has a knowledge of Vastu and hence is a vastukar.

When an individual wants a house or building constructed, a Raj Mistry is contacted, given an idea of the size and numbers of rooms wanted, and other details such as doors, windows and height. A Rajmistri (master mason) works with an assistant (jogali), who is less skilled and may achieve the status of raj mistri in due time. He also hires manual labor, if necessary, as well as a carpenter (kath-mistri). If there is to be a septic tank, the Raj Mistri builds the tank, though the soak-pit would be dug by the laborers.

In earlier days, Raj Mistry were employed for their services by Kings and were appointed as head craftsman of the Kingdom, just like Mistry or Gaidher. The term Raj means King in literal terms and Mistri refers to a master mason. So, it seems that those Mistry, who were appointed by the King as Chief Mason of the Kingdom, began to be called Raj Mistry.  

Raj Mistry were also known to be employed by jail authorities, and tasked with getting mason work and other labor completed using convicts.

Surname 
Descendants of the professional Raj Mistry or Raj Mistry caste often started using Raj Mistry as surnames, and many people of India or Indian origin use these as their last name.

Caste 
Raj Mistry are a Hindu as well as Muslim community mainly spread out in Northern and Western parts of India. The earlier British records of British India contain mentions of a tribe or caste named Raj Mistry, recorded in the census of 1891, but there is no mention of them in the later censuses of India or Pakistan. The term Raj Mistri was also used in the Muslim community.

See also

Mistri
Mistry (disambiguation)
Mistri (caste)
Gaidher
Mistris of Kutch

References

Surnames
Indian surnames
Ethnic groups in India
Social groups of India
Indian castes
Indian words and phrases
Indian architectural history
Social groups of Pakistan